Agualva may refer to the following parishes in Portugal:

Agualva (Praia da Vitória), in the Azores
Agualva (Sintra), Portugal
Agualva-Cacém, Portugal